Hall v Lorimer [1993] EWCA Civ 25 is a UK labour law case concerning the status of a worker as employed or self-employed. The Court of Appeal took the view that an employment contract requires regard to be had to the extent to which the worker is in business on their own account. Because Mr Lorimer took a business-like attitude to finding new clients he was held to be running a self-employed business and not working in a succession of short-term employments.

Facts
Mr Lorimer received £32,875 for his employment and incurred expenses of £9,250. He was a television technician working for 20 separate companies on short term jobs.

Judgment
Nolan LJ held that Lorimer was self-employed and could therefore set his expenses off against his income. He said what is partly relevant to employment status is,

He takes financial risks, provides his own tools/equipment, and takes the profits, and pays his own taxes and National Insurance contributions.

Following this judgment, the "proper approach" to determining whether an individual is employed or self-employed has been seen as an exercise looking at "the facts overall" and arriving at "a complete picture" of all the circumstances, "giving appropriate significance to each element".

See also

Contract of employment in English law
UK labour law
EU labour law
US labor law
German labour law

References

United Kingdom labour case law
Court of Appeal (England and Wales) cases
1993 in case law
1993 in British law